Franz (Fuxi) Fuchsberger (born Tamsweg, Austria) is an Austrian skier. He started skiing at the age of six.
	
After successfully completing his ski instructors' exam for full certification at the Sports Government Institute in St. Christoph, Austria, Fuchsberger moved to the United States and worked as a ski instructor at Boyne Mountain, Michigan during the 1983-84 season. He later moved to Big Sky, Montana, where he was introduced to the sport of Powder 8 skiing by Hans Schernthaner, a fellow ski instructor.

In 1987, he relocated to Vail, Colorado, where he taught skiing during the Colorado winter season while teaching in Australia and South America during the U.S. summer season.

Honors 
Three-time World Synchronized Demo Ski Team Champion / Team Vail
Ten-time Vail/Beaver Creek Ski School Overall Champion in SG/GS/SL
Twenty-five-time Powder 8 Champion with seventeen top three finishes in Powder 8 competitions
1991 - US Ski Instructor Champion GS, both as an individual and also with Team Vail
1996 - Overall Vail Town Champion in SG/GS/SL (Super-G/Giant Slalom/Slalom)
1997 - Number One Ranked Nastar Racer in the US (www.nastar.com)
1997 - World Powder 8 Champion with Hayden Scott.
1998 - World Alpine Synchronized Skiing Champion / Team Vail-Snowell
1998 - Ski Instructor of the Year
1998 - WORLD Powder 8 Champion with Hayden Scott.
1999 - Overall Vail Town Champion in SG/GS/SL
1999 - Beaver Creek Town Race Series Champion (Team SnowellUSA.com)
1999 - Vail Town Race Series Champion (Team SnowellUSA.com)
2000 - Synchro Ski World Championship Victory Samnaun/Switzerland
2000 - Beaver Creek Town Race Series Champion (Team SnowellUSA.com)
2000 - Vail Town Race Series Champion (Team SnowellUSA.com)
2000 - US Powder 8 Series Champion with Eric Archer
2001 - Beaver Creek Town Race Series Champion (Team SnowellUSA.com)
2001 - Vail Town Race Series Champion (Team SnowellUSA.com)
2001 - US Powder 8 Series Champion with Eric Archer
2001 - World Powder 8 Champion with partner Eric Archer
2002 - Vail Town Race Series Champion (Team SnowellUSA.com)
2002 - Beaver Creek Town Race Series Champion (Team SnowellUSA.com)
2002 - World Powder 8 Masters and Overall Champion with partner Pepi Neubauer
2002 - Runner up to Pepi Neubauer "DUKE CUP" - Vail, CO
2003 - Beaver Creek Town Race Series Champion (Team SnowellUSA.com)
2003 - Vail Ski School Overall Champion SG/GS/SL
2003 - World Powder 8 Masters Champion
2003 - Runner up to Pepi Neubauer "DUKE CUP" - Vail, CO
2003 - Vail Town Race Series Champion (Team SnowellUSA.com)
2004 - Runner up to Pepi Neubauer "DUKE CUP" - Vail, CO
2004 - "Heli Schaller Challenge Cup" Champion - Winterpark, CO
2004 - Vail Town Race Series Champion (Team SnowellUSA.com)
2004 - Beaver Creek Town Race Series Champion (Team SnowellUSA.com)
2004 - World Powder 8 Masters Champion
2005 - Runner up to Pepi Neubauer "DUKE CUP" - Vail, CO
2005 - Vail Town Race Series Champion (Team SnowellUSA.com)
2005 - Vail Town Race Series Individual Overall Champion
2005 - Beaver Creek Town Race Series Champion (Team SnowellUSA.com)
2005 - Vail Ski School Overall Champion SG/GS/SL
2005 - Rocky Mountain Masters - Elite Class Champion
2005 - 2nd Place World Powder 8 Masters Championships
2005 - National Masters Downhill Champion - Overall
2005 - 1st Place PRO-AM / Team Summit Fundraiser Giant Slalom

Notes

References 
Oliver, P (2001). "Skiing and Boarding", Outside Books.

External links 
 www.powder8.com

Austrian male alpine skiers
1958 births
Living people